Oberlin is a city in and the county seat of Decatur County, Kansas, United States.  As of the 2020 census, its population was 1,644.

History
Oberlin was platted in 1878. It was named after Oberlin, Ohio.  Its first post office was established in April, 1878, and the city was incorporated in 1885.

On September 30, 1878, Northern Cheyenne, fleeing from Indian Territory to their homes in the north during the Northern Cheyenne Exodus, attacked homesteaders near Oberlin, then a tiny hamlet. The raid's victims are commemorated in the "Last Indian Raid in Kansas" room of the Decatur County Museum, and by a monument in the town cemetery.

Geography
Oberlin is located at  (39.821235, -100.528369) at an elevation of 2,562 feet (781 m). It lies on the northwest side of Sappa Creek, a tributary of the Republican River, in the High Plains region of the Great Plains.

Climate
Oberlin has a humid continental climate (Köppen Dfa), with hot, dry summers and cold, dry winters. The average temperature is 52 °F (11 °C) with temperatures exceeding 90 °F (32 °C) an average of 62 days a year and dropping below 32 °F (0 °C) an average of 158 days a year. It typically experiences precipitation 66 days a year and snowfall 11 days a year. Precipitation averages 23 inches (574 mm) per year, and snowfall averages 32 inches (80 cm) per year. On average, January is the coldest month, and July is both the hottest month and the wettest month. The hottest temperature recorded there was 111 °F (44 °C) in 1954; the coldest temperature recorded was -31 °F (-35 °C) in 1989.

Demographics

2010 census
As of the census of 2010, there were 1,788 people, 824 households, and 477 families residing in the city. The racial makeup of the city was 96.9% White, 0.7% African American, 0.7% Native American, 0.3% Asian, 0.4% from other races, and 1.0% from two or more races. Hispanic or Latino of any race were 1.0% of the population.

There were 824 households, of which 21.2% had children under the age of 18 living with them, 47.8% were married couples living together, 7.3% had a female householder with no husband present, 2.8% had a male householder with no wife present, and 42.1% were non-families. 39.6% of all households were made up of individuals, and 19.6% had someone living alone who was 65 years of age or older. The average household size was 2.07 and the average family size was 2.73.

The median age in the city was 52 years. 20% of residents were under the age of 18; 4.1% were between the ages of 18 and 24; 17.4% were from 25 to 44; 29% were from 45 to 64; and 29.5% were 65 years of age or older. The gender makeup of the city was 47.4% male and 52.6% female.

2000 census
As of the census of 2000, there were 1,994 people, 879 households, and 550 families residing in the city. The racial makeup of the city was 97.79% White, 0.25% African American, 0.15% Native American, 0.20% Asian, 0.05% Pacific Islander, 0.25% from other races, and 1.30% from two or more races. Hispanic or Latino of any race were 1.15% of the population.

There were 879 households, out of which 25.8% had children under the age of 18 living with them, 51.8% were married couples living together, 7.6% had a female householder with no husband present, and 37.4% were non-families. 36.2% of all households were made up of individuals, and 20.7% had someone living alone who was 65 years of age or older. The average household size was 2.15 and the average family size was 2.78.

In the city, the population was spread out, with 22.6% under the age of 18, 5.1% from 18 to 24, 21.0% from 25 to 44, 21.4% from 45 to 64, and 29.9% who were 65 years of age or older. The median age was 46 years. For every 100 females, there were 85.1 males. For every 100 females age 18 and over, there were 79.3 males.

The median income for a household in the city was $30,816, and the median income for a family was $34,583. Males had a median income of $27,177 versus $16,488 for females. The per capita income for the city was $17,271. About 5.0% of families and 6.8% of the population were below the poverty line, including 7.1% of those under age 18 and 4.4% of those age 65 or over.

Arts and culture
Oberlin is home to the Last Indian Raid Museum, which contains multiple late 19th and early 20th century buildings filled with artifacts chronicling the history of the area and early Plains settlers. Examples include a 1930s grocery store and a one-room schoolhouse built in 1922.

Its a recreation center, completed in 2010, includes a 3D-capable movie theater and a bowling alley.

The Oberlin Area Band is an intergenerational band that rehearses weekly and performs quarterly.

Parks and recreation
The Oberlin City Park, near Decatur Community High School, and has a playground, picnic shelter, band shell, and full basketball court, and is home to the Oberlin swimming pool.

Sappa Park
The City of Oberlin is the owner of the Sappa Park two miles east of town. Formerly a state park, it has wetlands, bike and hiking paths, a nine-hole disc golf course, and a shelter house built by the Works Progress Administration in the 1930s. It is currently undergoing a multi-year improvement project. A nine-hole golf course is adjacent to it.

The park, originally by a lake, was developed in 1935 by the National Park Service. The Works Progress Administration (WPA) hired unemployed young men to build its dam and shelter house. It was dedicated in 1939, but over the years silt filled the lake and it was drained. Part of the lake has recently been restored as a wetlands.

Government
Oberlin is a city of the third class, according to state statute, with a mayor-council form of government. The city council consists of five members and meets on the first and third Thursday of each month at 7PM.

Education
The community is served by Oberlin USD 294 public school district, which operates two schools in the city:  Oberlin Elementary School (Grades Pre-K-6) and Decatur Community Junior/Senior High School (7-12).

Media
The Oberlin Herald is the city's sole newspaper, published weekly.

Two FM radio stations are licensed to and broadcast from Oberlin: 

 K-LOVE (translator station K217CY), at 91.3 FM, playing a Christian Contemporary format

Oberlin is in the Wichita-Hutchinson, Kansas television market. NBC affiliate KSNK, licensed to McCook, Nebraska, broadcasts on channel 8 from studios west of Oberlin. It is a satellite station of KSNW in Wichita.

Notable people
Notable people who were born in and/or have lived in Oberlin include:
Brun Campbell – ragtime composer, pianist
Sam Francis – #1 pick in 1937 NFL Draft, football coach at Kansas State University
Elmer Hackney – NFL running back
Richard Rogers – U.S. federal judge
Cora Simpson – nurse and nurse educator, founder of nursing school in Fuzhou, China

References

Further reading

External links

 City of Oberlin, and Decatur County website
 Oberlin - Directory of Public Officials
 Oberlin city map, KDOT

Cities in Kansas
County seats in Kansas
Cities in Decatur County, Kansas
Populated places established in 1878
1878 establishments in Kansas